Flight 841 may refer to:

 Los Angeles Airways Flight 841, helicopter crashed on May 22, 1968 
 Pan Am Flight 841, Hijacked on 2 July 1972
 Delta Air Lines Flight 841, a Detroit-Miami flight hijacked to Algeria on 31 July 1972
 TWA Flight 841 (1974), Terrorist suicide bomb in flight on September 8, 1974
 TWA Flight 841 (1979), loss of control on April 4, 1979

0841